Tevita Metuisela (born 16 October 1983 in Manly, New South Wales) is an Australian professional  rugby union and rugby league footballer.

Rugby League
In rugby league Metuisela played as a prop or second row forward, and appeared for the Sydney Roosters, Melbourne Storm and Wests Tigers teams. He was named in the Tonga training squad for the 2008 Rugby League World Cup.

Rugby Union
In 2009 Metuisela made the switch to rugby union where he plays as a back row forward, either flanker or Number Eight. He was a part of the ACT Brumbies Academy and has also played for the Manly club in Sydney. Metuisela played Super Rugby for the Western Force in 2011. He played for the Waratahs in 2012.

References

External links
Tevita Metuisela at planetrugby.com
Tevita Metuisela at NRL.com
Tevita Metuisela at the Rugby League Project
Tevita Metuisela at Wests Tigers

1983 births
Living people
Australian rugby union players
Australian rugby league players
Australian sportspeople of Tongan descent
Balmain Ryde-Eastwood Tigers players
New South Wales Waratahs players
Melbourne Storm players
Rugby league players from Sydney
Rugby league props
Rugby union players from Sydney
Sydney Roosters players
Western Force players
Wests Tigers players